German submarine U-600 was a Type VIIC U-boat built for Nazi Germany's Kriegsmarine for service during World War II.
She was laid down on 25 January 1941 by Blohm & Voss in Hamburg as yard number 576, launched on 16 October 1941 and commissioned on 11 December 1941 under Kapitänleutnant Bernhard Zurmühlen.

Design
German Type VIIC submarines were preceded by the shorter Type VIIB submarines. U-600 had a displacement of  when at the surface and  while submerged. She had two shafts and two  propellers.

U-600 was fitted with five  torpedo tubes (four fitted at the bow and one at the stern), fourteen torpedoes, one  SK C/35 naval gun, 220 rounds, and a  C/30 anti-aircraft gun. The boat had a complement of between forty-four and sixty.

Service history
The boat's service began on 11 December 1941 with training as part of the 5th U-boat Flotilla. She was transferred to the 3rd Flotilla, operating out of La Pallice, France, on 1 August 1942 for active service in the North Atlantic.

Wolfpacks
U-600 took part in eight wolfpacks, namely:
 Draufgänger (29 November – 11 December 1942)
 Raufbold (11 – 22 December 1942)
 Knappen (19 – 25 February 1943)
 Burggraf (4 – 5 March 1943)
 Raubgraf (7 – 20 March 1943)
 Drossel (29 April – 5 May 1943)
 Schill 1 (16 – 22 November 1943)
 Weddigen (22 – 25 November 1943)

Fate
All 45 hands were lost.

Summary of raiding history

References

Bibliography

External links

Ships lost with all hands
German Type VIIC submarines
1941 ships
U-boats commissioned in 1941
U-boats sunk by depth charges
U-boats sunk by British warships
U-boats sunk in 1943
World War II submarines of Germany
World War II shipwrecks in the Atlantic Ocean
Ships built in Hamburg
Maritime incidents in November 1943